Alicia Eva (born 2 April 1991) is an Australian rules footballer playing for the Greater Western Sydney Giants in the AFL Women's (AFLW). She previously played for the Collingwood Football Club in 2017. Eva was selected in the AFL Women's All-Australian team and won the Gabrielle Trainor Medal in her first season at the Giants in 2018. She has served as Greater Western Sydney captain since the 2020 season.

Early life
Eva grew up supporting the Melbourne Football Club, and her favourite player was their former captain David Neitz. Eva was forced to stop playing local football at the age of thirteen when she was no longer allowed to play alongside boys, and instead took up coaching.

AFL Women's career

Collingwood (2017)
She was appointed vice-captain at Collingwood in late January 2017. Eva made her debut in round 1, 2017, in the league's inaugural match at IKON Park against . She played in all seven of Collingwood's matches that season, kicking three goals and leading the club in both total and average disposals. At season's end she placed second in the club's best and fairest award. Eva was named in the All-Australian squad of 40 players, but did not make the final team.

Greater Western Sydney (2018–present)
Following her first season with the Giants, in which she played all seven games and ranked second in the competition for average kicks (13.7 per game) and third for tackles (52), Eva was selected on the wing in the 2018 AFL Women's All-Australian team and won the Gabrielle Trainor Medal as the Giants' best-and-fairest ahead of 2018 AFLW Players' Most Valuable Player Courtney Gum.

In November 2019, after inaugural Greater Western Sydney captain Amanda Farrugia announced her sudden retirement, Eva was announced as the club's new captain. Leading into the 2020 season, womens.afl journalist Sarah Black named Eva at no. 30 on her list of the top 30 players in the AFLW. Eva missed an AFLW match for the first time in 2020, missing rounds 5 and 6 with a foot injury, before returning to play in Greater Western Sydney's semi-final loss against .

Statistics
Updated to the end of S7 (2022).

|-
| 2017 ||  || 2
| 7 || 3 || 1 || 63 || 16 || 79 || 16 || 31 || 0.4 || 0.1 || 9.0 || 2.3 || 11.3 || 2.3 || 4.4 || 0
|-
| 2018 ||  || 2
| 7 || 1 || 1 || 96 || 29 || 125 || 10 || 52 || 0.1 || 0.1 || 13.7 || 4.1 || 17.9 || 1.4 || 7.4 || 3
|-
| 2019 ||  || 2
| 7 || 2 || 1 || 90 || 29 || 119 || 15 || 20 || 0.3 || 0.1 || 12.9 || 4.1 || 17.0 || 2.1 || 2.9 || 5
|-
| 2020 ||  || 2
| 5 || 0 || 2 || 52 || 23 || 75 || 10 || 36 || 0.0 || 0.4 || 10.4 || 4.6 || 15.0 || 2.0 || 7.2 || 5
|-
| 2021 ||  || 2
| 9 || 1 || 2 || 108 || 41 || 149 || 16 || 38 || 0.1 || 0.2 || 12.0 || 4.6 || 16.6 || 1.8 || 4.2 || 1
|-
| 2022 ||  || 2
| 10 || 0 || 1 || 128 || 51 || 179 || 22 || 64 || 0.0 || 0.1 || 12.8 || 5.1 || 17.9 || 2.2 || 6.4 || 7
|-
| S7 (2022) ||  || 2
| 10 || 0 || 2 || 108 || 52 || 160 || 15 || 41 || 0.0 || 0.2 || 10.8 || 5.2 || 16.0 || 1.5 || 4.1 || 3
|- class=sortbottom
! colspan=3 | Career
! 55 !! 7 !! 10 !! 644 !! 241 !! 885 !! 104 !! 282 !! 0.1 !! 0.2 !! 11.7 !! 4.4 !! 16.1 !! 1.9 !! 5.1 !! 24
|}

Coaching career
Eva coached the Calder Cannons in the TAC Cup Girls competition in 2017, winning the competition's inaugural premiership, and led the NSW/ACT Youth Girls and Eastern Allies teams in the 2018 AFL Women's Under 18 Championships. She has served as a development coach of 's North East Australian Football League (NEAFL) team since 2018.

In September 2017, Eva was featured in the AFL Media series The Chase, where she spoke about her initially limited playing opportunities in women's Australian rules football and her time in coaching prior to the creation of the AFL Women's, as well as her coaching aspirations post-football. In April 2019, Eva received the inaugural AFLCA coaching pathway scholarship, including a 12-month mentorship by then- coach John Worsfold, which included being mentored and she was enrolled in the second intake of the AFL Women's Coaching Academy later that year. She later completed a study tour in the United States at the end of the AFL season as part of her scholarship.

Honours and achievements
 Greater Western Sydney captain: 2020–present
 AFL Women's All-Australian team: 2018
 Gabrielle Trainor Medal: 2018
 Victoria representative honours in AFL Women's State of Origin: 2017

References

External links

 
 
 

Living people
1991 births
Collingwood Football Club (AFLW) players
Australian rules footballers from Victoria (Australia)
Sportswomen from Victoria (Australia)
Greater Western Sydney Giants (AFLW) players
All-Australians (AFL Women's)
Melbourne University Football Club (VFLW) players